Newport Historic District or Newport Downtown Historic District may refer to:
Newport Downtown Historic District (New Hampshire)
Newport Historic District (Newport, Pennsylvania)
Newport Historic District (Rhode Island)
Newport Downtown Historic District (Newport, Vermont)
Newport Historic District (Newport, Virginia)

See also
East Row Historic District, Newport, Kentucky
Greater Newport Rural Historic District, Newport, Virginia
Newport (disambiguation)